Ladislav Janoušek was a Czech cyclist. He competed in two events at the 1920 Summer Olympics.

References

External links
 

Year of birth missing
Year of death missing
Czech male cyclists
Olympic cyclists of Czechoslovakia
Cyclists at the 1920 Summer Olympics
Place of birth missing